Vaibhav Bhatt (born 25 November 1995) is an Indian cricketer. He made his List A debut for Uttarakhand in the 2018–19 Vijay Hazare Trophy on 20 September 2018. He made his first-class debut for Uttarakhand in the 2018–19 Ranji Trophy on 12 November 2018. He made his Twenty20 debut on 5 November 2021, for Uttarakhand in the 2021–22 Syed Mushtaq Ali Trophy.

References

External links
 

1995 births
Living people
Indian cricketers
Uttarakhand cricketers
Place of birth missing (living people)